The Z-class torpedo boats were a class of twelve warships that served in the Dutch Koninklijke Marine, German Kaiserliche Marine, Polish Marynarka Wojenna and British Royal Navy. The Royal Netherlands Navy ordered eight Z-class torpedo boats before the outbreak of World War I, four were to be built by the German shipbuilder AG Vulcan Stettin, to be named Z 1 to Z 4, while four others were to be built in the Netherlands; Z 5 to Z 8. After the outbreak of World War I the four ships under construction in Germany where requisitioned for service in the German navy, resulting in the Dutch Navy to order another four ships to be built in the Netherlands. The ships saw action during both World War I and World War II. One of the German ships was lost in World War I, while one Polish and one Dutch ship sank during World War II. Another Polish torpedo boat sank in peacetime due to a boiler explosion.

Ships

Citations

References

Further reading
 
 
 

Z-class torpedo boats
Ships built in the Netherlands
Ships built in Germany
Torpedo boat classes
Torpedo boats of the Imperial German Navy
Torpedo boats of the Royal Navy
Torpedo boats of the Polish Navy
World War I torpedo boats of Germany
World War II naval ships of Poland
World War II naval ships of the Netherlands
World War II naval ships of the United Kingdom